Peter Farrelly and Bobby Farrelly, collectively referred to as the Farrelly brothers, are American screenwriters and directors. They have made eleven films together, including Dumb and Dumber, Outside Providence, and There's Something About Mary.

Early life
The brothers were raised in Cumberland, Rhode Island, and are of Irish descent. Following college, they pursued careers as television writers, notably for Seinfeld.

Themes
Each of the brothers' first four films (Dumb and Dumber, Kingpin, There's Something About Mary, and Me, Myself & Irene) has a plot centering on a road trip. These trips all originate in Rhode Island, except for Kingpin, which begins in Pennsylvania. Their films make frequent use of slapstick and toilet humor, and are often populated with blunt, profane working-class characters in small roles. Many of their films contain flashback scenes that show how a character was affected by a traumatic event. The brothers are also noted for their soundtracks, which typically feature distinctive selections of classic and contemporary power pop and folk rock songs.

Sports are a common feature of their films and they have often cast sports stars (particularly from New England teams)  for bit parts and cameo appearances, including Cam Neely, Johnny Damon, Roger Clemens, Brett Favre, Anna Kournikova, and Tom Brady.

The brothers have been praised and critiqued for the way they use the subject of disability in their films. Peter Farrelly has commented:  Peter Farrelly has published books, including Outside Providence and The Comedy Writer.

Filmography

Film

Television

References

External links
 
 

1956 births
1958 births
Living people
Sibling duos
American people of Irish descent
American people of Polish descent
American male screenwriters
Screenwriting duos
People from Cumberland, Rhode Island
Sibling filmmakers
Writers from Rhode Island
Film directors from Rhode Island
Screenwriters from Rhode Island
American film producers
American television directors
American television producers
American disability rights activists